Wallachians could mean:

 Vlachs, Eastern Romance-speaking peoples of southeastern Europe
 Inhabitants of Wallachia, a region of Romania
 Inhabitants of Moravian Wallachia, a region in eastern Czech Republic